Fred Sunnen (11 April 1939 in Differdange – 22 February 2014) was a Luxembourgian politician for the Christian Social People's Party (CSV).  He was a member of the national legislature, the Chamber of Deputies, having been first elected in the 1999 election to represent the Sud constituency.

Sunnen was the Mayor of Sanem from 14 May 1997 until 30 November 2005, when he was replaced by Georges Engel of the Luxembourg Socialist Workers' Party.  He was a member of the communal council, in which the CSV forms the joint-largest contingent.  In the most recent elections, on 9 October 2005, Sunnen won the greatest number of votes of all candidates.

Footnotes

External links
  Official Chamber of Deputies biography

Mayors of Sanem
Members of the Chamber of Deputies (Luxembourg)
Members of the Chamber of Deputies (Luxembourg) from Sud
Councillors in Sanem
Christian Social People's Party politicians
1939 births
2014 deaths
People from Differdange